Double or Nothing is the fourth album by Lani Hall.

Track listing 
"Nobody Gets This Close to Me" (Steve Diamond) 4:20
"Shot in the Dark" (Bill Quateman) 3:38
"Meni Devol" (Ruben Rada, Hugo Fattoruso; English translation by Lani Hall) 5:10
"To the Morning" (Dan Fogelberg) 3:57
"Sailing Without a Sail" (Bill LaBounty, Roy Freeland) 3:12
"Double or Nothing" (Allee Willis, Skip Scarborough) 4:48
"Sunshine After the Rain" (Ellie Greenwich) 4:42
"To Know" (Buzz Feiten) 4:25
"So Long" (Lani Hall, Neil Larsen) 2:57
"Magic Garden" (Buzz Feiten) 3:46

Album credits

Performance credits 
Lani Hall - vocals and backing vocals on 7, 8, 10)
Neil Larsen - keyboards, backing vocals
Buzz Feiten - guitar, backing vocals
Chuck Domanico - bass
Peter Donald - drums
Manolo Badrena - percussion
Jerry Knight - bass on 1,2,6,10
Larry Tolbert - drums, percussion on 1,2,6,10
Paulinho da Costa - percussion on 4, 7
Michel Colombier - electric piano & synthesizer on 8
Michael Boddicker - synthesizer programmer
Airto Moreira - chanting and percussion on 3
Ernie Watts - saxophone solo on 7
Tim May - guitar on 4, 8
Bill Champlin, Carmen Twillie, Venetta Gould - backing vocals on 4,5,7
Bill Quateman - backing vocals on 2
David Lasley, Arnold McCuller - backing vocals on 1,6
Jerry Hey, Ernie Watts, Larry Williams, Gary Grant, Bill Reichenbach Jr. - horn section

References 

1979 albums
Lani Hall albums
Albums produced by Herb Alpert
A&M Records albums